Jacobus Francois Pienaar (born 2 January 1967) is a retired South African rugby union player. He played flanker for South Africa (the Springboks) from 1993 until 1996, winning 29 international caps, all of them as captain. He is best known for leading South Africa to victory in the 1995 Rugby World Cup. After being dropped from the Springbok team in 1996, Pienaar went on to a career with English club Saracens.

Early life and education
Pienaar  was born in Vereeniging, South Africa, into a working class Afrikaner family, and is the eldest of four boys. After completing high school at Hoërskool Patriot Witbank, he won an athletic scholarship to the Rand Afrikaans University, where he studied law.

Playing career 
He made his provincial debut for Transvaal Province in 1989 before being selected for the South Africa squad in 1993. He was appointed Springbok captain from his first test and remained captain until his last, and remains one of the most successful South African captains of all time.

In 1993 Transvaal won the Super 10, Currie Cup and Lion Cup under Pienaar. In 1994, Transvaal retained the Currie Cup under his captaincy and he was voted international player of the year by Rugby World magazine.

1995 World Cup

Pienaar is most famous for being captain of the first South Africa team to win the World Cup. Prior to the World Cup in 1995, the Springboks were only seeded ninth and were not expected to dethrone the incumbent champions Australia, who had not lost a game in the preceding 12 months.

During the tournament, South Africa defeated Australia, Romania, Canada, Western Samoa, and France. They then met New Zealand in the 1995 Rugby World Cup Final at Ellis Park Stadium. Pienaar led the Springboks to a three-point victory with a drop goal from Joel Stransky.

During the remarkable post-match presentation ceremony Nelson Mandela, wearing a Springbok jersey bearing Pienaar's number, presented him with the Webb Ellis Cup. During his acceptance speech, Pienaar made it clear that the team had won the trophy not just for the 60,000 fans at Ellis Park, but also for all 43,000,000 South Africans.

Pienaar is portrayed by Matt Damon in the film Invictus, released in December 2009, which focuses on the story of the 1995 World Cup.

Later career
Within a month of the World Cup's conclusion Pienaar had a stand-off with SARFU after he led South African players in threatening to join their Australia and New Zealand counterparts to play professionally for the World Rugby Corporation (WRC). Pienaar had convinced numerous Springbok players to sign with the WRC, but Louis Luyt eventually dissuaded them from breaking with the SARFU. During this standoff, Pienaar offered the black Springbok player Chester Williams less than other contemporary South African players. In purely marketing terms, Williams was second only to Jonah Lomu.

Subsequently, Springbok players were given contracts and the International Rugby Board (IRB) voted in favour of professionalisation. Pienaar was instrumental in negotiating the deal between SANZAR and Rupert Murdoch's News Corporation that turned rugby into a fully-fledged professional game. Some of the older generation rugby administrators branded him a traitor for selling out South African rugby to professionalism.

In 1996, Pienaar was controversially dropped from the Springbok side, after 29 caps, by coach Andre Markgraaff, who accused him of feigning an injury during a match.

Pienaar subsequently left for Britain, where he became player-coach for Watford-based club Saracens. Under his leadership, they defeated the London Wasps to win the Pilkington Cup and also finished second in the Zurich Premiership. During the next two seasons, they secured third and fourth spots in the Zurich Premiership, thereby qualifying for the European Cup on consecutive campaigns.

Pienaar captained the Barbarians in his only appearance for the club against Leicester at Twickenham in 1999.

Test history 
 World Cup Final

Retirement
In 2000, Pienaar retired as a player and became Saracens’ CEO. As a consequence of the club's lack of success during the two following years, Pienaar stepped down as coach and CEO in 2002. Piennar is one of 3 directors of Saracens as of 5/20.

In 2002 he returned to Cape Town, South Africa, where he lives with his wife Nerine Winter and two sons. Both had Nelson Mandela as a godfather. 

Pienaar wrote his autobiography Rainbow Warrior with Edward Griffiths in 1999. In November 2000, he was awarded an honorary doctorate by the University of Hertfordshire.

Pienaar was also involved in South Africa's failed bid to host the 2011 Rugby World Cup in 2005.

He was a pundit for ITV Sport during the Rugby World Cups of 2007, 2011 and 2015.

Depictions in media
Pienaar and Mandela are the subject of a 2008 book by John Carlin, Playing the Enemy: Nelson Mandela and the Game that Made a Nation, that spotlights the role of the 1995 Cup win in post-apartheid South Africa. Carlin sold the film rights to Morgan Freeman. The 2009 film Invictus, based on the book, was directed by Clint Eastwood, and starred Morgan Freeman as Nelson Mandela and Matt Damon as Pienaar.

Awards and honours
In 1995 he was voted Rugby Personality of the Year by Britain's Rugby Union Writers' Club, as well as Newsmaker of the Year in South Africa.
In 2004 he was voted 50th in the Top 100 Great South Africans.
In 2005 he was inducted into the International Rugby Hall of Fame.
 On 24 October 2011, he was inducted into the IRB Hall of Fame.

See also
List of South Africa national rugby union players – Springbok no. 584

Bibliography
 Pienaar, François, and Edward Griffiths (1999). Rainbow Warrior. London: CollinsWillow. 
 Carlin, John (2008). Playing the Enemy: Nelson Mandela and the Game that Made a Nation. New York: Penguin Press.

Notes and references

Notes

References

External links

1967 births
Living people
People from Vereeniging
Afrikaner people
South African rugby union players
South African rugby union coaches
South Africa international rugby union players
Rugby union flankers
Golden Lions players
Saracens F.C. players
Barbarian F.C. players
World Rugby Hall of Fame inductees
South Africa national rugby union team captains
Rugby union players from Gauteng